The wilaya of Ouled Djellal is an Algerian province created in 2019, previously, a delegated wilaya created in 2015. It is in the Algerian Sahara.

Geography 
The wilaya of Ouled Djellal is located in the Algerian Sahara, its area 131,220 km²   .

It is delimited by:

 to the north by the M'sila Province;
 to the east by the Biskra Province and El M'Ghair Province;
 to the west by the Djelfa Province;
 and to the south by the Ouargla Province.

History 
The wilaya of Ouled Djellal was created on November 26, 2019 .

Previously, it was a delegated wilaya, created according to the law n° 15–140 of May 27, 2015, creating administrative districts in certain wilayas and fixing the specific rules related to them, as well as the list of municipalities that are attached to it. Before 2019, it was attached to the Biskra Province.

Organization of the wilaya 
During the administrative breakdown of 2015, the delegated wilaya of Ouled Djellal is made up of 3 communes and 2 Districts

List of walis

References 

 
Provinces of Algeria
Sahara
States and territories established in 2019